The 2012–13 OK Liga Femenina was the fifth edition of Spain's premier women's rink hockey championship, running from September 15, 2012 to May 25, 2013. 

CP Voltregà won its third title in a row while Reus Deportiu and Cerdanyola were relegated to Primera Nacional. Despite to finish in relegation positions, Borbolla and Traviesas regained its spots in OK Liga, as Reus and Cerdanyola resigned to their places in the league due to their financial problems.

Voltregà, Biesca Gijón, Girona and Alcorcón qualified for CERH Women's Euroleague.

Teams

Standings

Source:

Top scorers

Source:

Copa de la Reina

The 2013 Copa de la Reina was the 8th edition of the Spanish women's roller hockey cup. It was played in Sant Hipòlit de Voltregà between the four first qualified teams after the first half of the season.

Biesca Gijón won its second consecutive title after beating CP Alcorcón by 3–2 in the final, thanks to a golden goal.

References

External links
RFEP official website

2012 in roller hockey
2013 in roller hockey
OK Liga Femenina seasons